Darío Armando García Granados, better known as Dago García (Bogota, 11 February 1962), is a screenwriter, film producer, director, editor and social communicator. He works currently as production vice-president of Colombian private television network Canal Caracol. He is one of Colombia's most well-known screenwriters.

Personal life 
Dago García has a degree in Social Communication from Universidad Externado. García was married to actress Martha Osorio, with whom he has two girls (18 and 26 years old). From 2000 on he has been in a relationship with journalist María Mercedes (Mechaz) Sánchez. His brother, Mario Iván García Granados, is currently an executive producer of Dago García Producciones, the producing company he founded. García also used to play as DJ in the well-known “Quiebracanto” pub in Bogota.

Work 
Dago  García has been writing for television, theatre and cinema from the 90's, during which time he has written and produced more than thirty series and soap operas (some in association with Luis Felipe Salamanca), a fellow graduate from University Externado of Colombia. Among his creations are popular soap operas “Pedro el Escamoso” (2001), “Pecados capitales” (2002), and “La saga” (2004), among numerous others, which have obtained him national and Latin American awards like Simón Bolívar, India Catalina, Tv y Novelas, and El Tiempo for Best Screenwriting and Best Soap opera. He also obtained the prize to Best Screenwriting and Best Producing Company in the Latin American meeting of soap operas of 2004, in Uruguay.

In addition to his work in soap operas, Dago García has been working prolifically in producing and writing movies. "La mujer del piso alto" and "Posición viciada" both obtained the Cinemateca Distrital 25 years award Best Script, and were nominated by Colombia to the Goya Awards in 1998. His Es mejor ser rico que pobre participated in the Official Selection in the Festivals of Cartagena, Chicago, Montreal, Miami, and Villaverdey.

"Dago García Producciones" was created by him and Juan Carlos Velásquez in 1995, and from 1999 has managed to produce a film every year aimed at the general public in Colombia. García has been producer, screenwriter and co-editor of several films with the company. Despite receiving very negative reviews from critics, these movies have proved to be quite successful at the box office in Colombia, grossing on occasion more than Hollywood films.

García has also been teacher of screen writing for many universities in Colombia (Externado, the Javeriana, Jorge Tadeo Lozano, Rosary, Central University, and Minuto de Dios) and in Cuba (International School of Cinema and Television of Saint Antonio of the Bathrooms).

Filmography

Television

Theatre

Other works

References

External links
 

Universidad Externado de Colombia alumni
People from Bogotá
Colombian film directors
Colombian screenwriters
Male screenwriters
1962 births
Colombian film producers
Living people